Independent Socialist Party may refer to:

Independent-Socialist Party, New York State, United States
Independent Socialist Party (Argentina)
Independent Socialist Party (Bolivia)
Independent Socialist Party (Bolivia, 1944)
Independent Socialist Party (Greece)
Independent Socialist Party (Hungary)
Independent Socialist Party (Ireland)
Independent Socialist Party (Luxembourg)
Independent Socialist Party (Netherlands)
Independent Socialist Party (Romania)
Independent Socialist Party (Turkey)
Independent Socialist Party (UK)
Independent Socialist Party of Chad
Independent Socialist Party of Chad (1955)

See also
Independent Socialist Faction
Socialist Party (disambiguation)